Rivers play a prominent part in the hymns of the Rigveda, and consequently in early Vedic religion. Vedic texts have a wide geographical horizon, speaking of oceans, rivers, mountains and deserts. 

The Vedic land is described as a land of the seven rivers (sapta sindhavaḥ) flowing into the ocean. It encompasses the northwestern Indian subcontinent from Gandhara to Kurukshetra.

Geography of the Rigveda

Identification of Rigvedic hydronyms has engaged multiple historians; it is the single most important way of establishing the geography and chronology of the early Vedic period. Rivers with certain identifications stretch from eastern Afghanistan to the western Gangetic plain, clustering in the Punjab. The region's name comes from پنج, panj, 'five' and آب, āb, 'water' thus "five waters", a Persianized form of the Indo-Aryan Panchanada meaning "five rivers". Many have cognates in Avestan.

The same names were often imposed on different rivers as the Vedic culture migrated eastward from around Afghanistan (where they stayed for a considerable time) to mainland India via Punjab.

List

Multiple hydronyms are located in the Rigvedic corpus; they are slotted according to rough geographical locations, following the scheme of Michael Witzel. Alongside, opinions of scholars about modern correlates are provided:

Indus:

 Síndhu - Identified with Indus. The central lifeline of RV.

Northwestern Rivers:

    Tr̥ṣṭā́mā - Blažek identifies with Gilgit. Witzel notes it to be unidentified.
    Susártu - Unidentified.
    Ánitabhā - Unidentified.
    Rasā́ - Described once to be on the upper Indus; at other times a mythical entity.
Mehatnū - A tributary of Gomatī́. Unidentifiable.
    Śvetyā́ - Unidentified.
    Kúbhā - Identified with Kabul river.
    Krúmu - Identified with Kurrum.
    Suvā́stu - Identified with Swat.
Gomatī́ - Identified with Gomal.
Saráyu / Harōiiu - Blažek identifies with Sarju. Witzel identifies with Hari.
    Kuṣávā - Probably Kunar.
Yavyā́vatī - Noted to be a branch of Gomatī́. Witzel as well as Blažek identifies with Zhob River. Dähnhardt comments it to be synonymous to Yamúnā or flowing very close to it but Witzel had rejected a similar take by Talgeri.

Eastern tributaries: 
    Suṣómā - Identified with Soan.
    Arjikiya - Blažek identifies with Haro. Witzel speculates it to be Poonch or Tawi.
 Rivers of Punjab:
    Vitástā - Identified with Jhelum.
    Asiknī́ - Identified with Chenab.
    Paruṣṇī - Probably Ravi.
    Vípāś/Vípāśi/Vípāśā - Identified with Beas.
    Śutudrī́ - Identified with Sutlej.
    Marúdvr̥dhā - Identified with Mahuvardhavan.

Haryana: 
    Sarasvati - .
    Āpayā́ and Āpayā́ - Streams/rivers of Sarasvati basin.
Dr̥ṣádvatī - .

Eastern Rivers:
    Áśmanvatī - Identified with Assan.
Yamúnā - Identified with Yamuna.
Aṃśumátī - Probably an epithet for Yamúnā.
    Gáṅgā - Identified with Ganges.

See also

 
Ap (water)
Aryan migration
Nadistuti sukta
Old European hydronymy
Out of India theory
Rigvedic deities
River goddess
Samudra
Zhetysu - 7 rivers of Central Asia

References

Further reading
General
 Blažek, Václav. "Hydronymia R̥gvedica". In: Linguistica Brunensia. 2016, vol. 64, iss. 2, pp. 7–54. ; .
 Gherardo Gnoli, De Zoroastre à Mani. Quatre leçons au Collège de France (Travaux de l’Institut d’Études Iraniennes de l’Université de la Sorbonne Nouvelle 11), Paris (1985)

 
Rivers
History of India
Rivers of Sindh
Hydronymy
Rivers of Pakistan